Andrew S. Bishop (1894–1959) was an actor on stage and screen. He and Cleo Desmond drew adoring fans to their theatrical performances. He starred in several of Oscar Michaux's African American films.

He was part of the Anita Bush stock company.

Bishop is one of the actors pictured on a lobby card for the 1935 film Temptation held by the National Museum of African American History and Culture.

Filmography
A Son of Satan (working title The Ghost of Tolston's Manor) (1924) as Ghost
The House Behind the Cedars (1927) as George Tryon
Murder in Harlem (1935) as Anthony Brisbane
Temptation as Kid Cotton

References

External links

American male film actors
American male stage actors
1894 births
1959 deaths
African-American male actors
20th-century African-American people
20th-century American male actors